Zatara may also refer to:

People
Imad Zatara (born 1984), Swedish-born Palestinian footballer
Ilunga Mande Zatara (born 1983), Democratic Republic of Congo Olympic runner

Characters
 Zatara Master Magician, a DC Comics comics title
 Zatanna Zatara, the superheroine "Zatanna", daughter of John Zatara
 For the Golden Age character, see Giovanni "John" Zatara
 For the Teen Titans ally, see Zachary Zatara
 Wanda Zatara, an Amalgam Comics character, see List of Amalgam Comics characters

See also
 Zattara, province of Africa, Roman Empire
 Giuseppe Zattera (1826–1891), Italian landscape painter